The Swedish Trade Union Confederation (literally "The National Organisation in Sweden"), commonly referred to as LO, is a national trade union centre, an umbrella organisation for fourteen Swedish trade unions that organise mainly "blue-collar" workers. The Confederation, which gathers in total about 1.5 million employees out of Sweden's 10 million people population, was founded in 1898 by blue-collar unions on the initiative of the 1897 Scandinavian Labour Congress and the Swedish Social Democratic Party, which almost exclusively was made up by trade unions. In 2019 union density of Swedish blue-collar workers was 60%, a decline by seventeen percentage points since 2006 (blue-collar union density in 2006: 77%). A strongly contributing factor was the considerably raised fees to union unemployment funds in January 2007 made by the new centre-right government.

Organisation

The fourteen affiliates of the Swedish Trade Union Confederation span both the private and the public sector. The member unions are fully independent, with the role of the Confederation limited to the co-ordination of wage bargaining, international activities, trade union education and other areas. Another important task is to promote the organisation's views to decision-makers and the general public. It also has representatives on the governing bodies of many government authorities. The Confederation is also responsible for research and signing labour market insurance schemes. The member unions, however, carry the responsibility for the administration of the unemployment insurance funds.

While its Danish sister organisation, the Danish Confederation of Trade Unions, cut its formal ties to the country's Social Democratic party in 1995, the Swedish Trade Union Confederation maintains a strong cooperation with the Social Democrats. Although the organisations are independent from each other, the Swedish Trade Union Confederation has a representative on the party’s executive committee elected by the Party Congress. Also, both the Confederation and the member unions contribute substantial amounts of money to the party.

Until 1987 there was a system of collective membership in the Social Democratic Party for members in the confederation, in which the local union could apply for membership in the Social Democratic Party, effectively enrolling all its members into the Social Democratic Party. (An individual could decline to be part of this collective membership.)

Until recently, The Swedish Trade Union Confederation owned 50.1% of the evening newspaper Aftonbladet, the largest daily newspaper in Scandinavia. As of 2012, the organisation owns 9% of the newspaper. The organisation bought Aftonbladet in 1956 but sold off 49.9 percent to Norwegian media company Schibsted on 2 May 1996.

The number of member unions have been reduced by mergers. Most recently the Forest and Wood Workers' Union and the Graphic Workers' Union merged into the single union GS Union on 1 June 2009.

Affiliates

Current affiliates

Former affiliates

List of chairmen
 Fredrik Sterky, 1898–1900
 Herman Lindqvist, 1900–1920
 Arvid Thorberg, 1920–1930
 Edvard Johanson, 1930–1936
 Albert Forslund, February–September 1936
 August Lindberg, 1936–1947
 Axel Strand, 1947–1956
 Arne Geijer, 1956–1973
 Gunnar Nilsson, 1973–1983
 Stig Malm, 1983–1993
 Bertil Jonsson, 1994–2000
 Wanja Lundby-Wedin, 2000—2012
 Karl-Petter Thorwaldsson, 2012–2020
 Susanna Gideonsson, 2020–present

See also

 Danish Confederation of Trade Unions (Danish LO)
 Norwegian Confederation of Trade Unions (Norwegian LO)
 Swedish Confederation of Professional Employees (TCO)
 Swedish Confederation of Professional Associations (SACO)
 Central Organisation of the Workers of Sweden (SAC, Swedish trade union not connected to LO)
 Rehn–Meidner Model

References

 
Labour movement in Sweden
International Trade Union Confederation
European Trade Union Confederation
Swedish Social Democratic Party
1898 establishments in Sweden
Trade unions established in 1898
Organizations based in Stockholm